Cowbois ac Injans (Cowboys and Engines) is a Welsh language television drama written by brother and sister Jon Tregenna and Catherine Tregenna which was broadcast on S4C. The series was made by Teledu Opus, which later became Rondo Productions. The title was a pun on the phrase "Cowboys and "Injuns"; "injun", a mis-pronunciation of "Indian" (as in "American Indian") sounds similar to "injan", Welsh for "engine".

Plot
The comedy drama is set in a used car showroom, Garej Wheelers, somewhere in the Wild West of Wales. Things don't always go according to plan. It's a world of love, lies and second-hand cars. The series also deals in the fading dreams of the staff, for as Billy Wheeler said, 'No ever grows up wanting to be a car salesman.' The series had a serial element but also featured a 'story of the week' with guest actors appearing to take the role of customers.

Main characters
Bili Wheeler: Simon Fisher - patriarchal figure and proprietor of Wheelers
Balders: Rhodri Evan - hapless clown-like salesman who write romantic fiction in his spare time.
Jo-Jo: Catherine Ayers - Billy's daughter - former carnival queen who has a crush on Manny.
Manny: Geraint Todd - new salesman just back from London where he was in a band. 
Cez: Mared Swain - Jo-Jo's best friend and Manny's loving wife.
Del: Janet Aethwy - 40-something and fiery - a woman whose husband left her for a younger model.
Jimmy: Neil Williams - Del's ex - an underwear salesman.
Carwyn: John Rowley - Balders' mute cousin.
Arwyn: Rhys ap William - Balders' bullying cousin.
Val: Sara Harris-Davies - Billy's wife.
Russ: Gareth Morris - Cez's Dad - he's dying of cancer which is the reason Cez and Manny came home.
Vince: Huw Ceredig - barfly at the local pub.

Location
The main location - the showroom - was in The Herberts, a small village outside Cowbridge in the Vale Of Glamorgan. It was formerly a Rover dealership. The building has since been demolished. Other locations included Pontarddulais, Llanelli, Llantrisant and various other locations throughout the Vale.

History
The series was commissioned by Angharad Jones for S4C. The first series of 8 episodes aired during Autumn 2006. The series returned for a second series which began transmission on 4 February 2007.

Awards
In April 2007, Cowbois ac Injans was awarded the prize for Best Drama Series at the Celtic Media Festival in Scotland .

At the 2007 BAFTA Cymru Awards, Gareth Bryn Evans won the prize for Best Newcomer after directing episode six of Cowbois ac Injans Series 1.

At the 2008 BAFTA Cymru Awards, Rhodri Evan won Best Actor for his role as 'Balders'. The prize was presented by Ruth Jones from Gavin & Stacey.

References

External links
 Cowbois ac Injans Website

2006 British television series debuts
2007 British television series endings
S4C original programming
British drama television series
2000s British drama television series
2000s Welsh television series